Eanfrith may refer to:

Eanfrith of Bernicia (590–634) 
Eanfrith of Hwicce (fl. c. 660–685)
Eanfrith of Elmham (d. c. 769), Bishop of Elmham

See also
 Eadfrith